The Hatchery LLC is an American media production company, which was owned by American Greetings and Mandalay Entertainment and located in Burbank, California.

Margaret Loesch and Bruce Stein formed Hatchery in 2003 with financing from Peter Guber and Paul Schaeffer of Mandalay Entertainment Group. American Greetings Corporation purchased a major stake in the company in December 2004, joining Mandalay in joint ownership.

American Greetings thereafter licensed their Care Bears and Strawberry Shortcake characters in various filmed projects with Hatchery, marketing their products via their approximately 600 stores and 35,000 greeting card retail locations. The Hatchery has produced two programs that aired on cable channel The Hub: R. L. Stine's The Haunting Hour and Dan Vs..

Shows produced
Balderdash (2004–2005)
Young Blades (2005)
The Zula Patrol (Season 1; 2005–2006)
R. L. Stine's The Haunting Hour: Don’t Think About It (2007)
R. L. Stine's The Haunting Hour (2010–2014)
Dan Vs. (2011–2013)

References

External links

Film production companies of the United States
Mass media companies established in 2003
Companies based in Burbank, California
American Greetings